A pump-action rifle is a rifle where the forend can be moved forward and backward in order to eject a spent round of ammunition and to chamber a new one. Pump-action mechanisms are often regarded as faster than a bolt action and somewhat faster than a lever action, as it does not require the trigger hand to be removed from the trigger while reloading. Most pump actions do, however, have a firing mechanism using a hammer, which leads to a longer lock time than the hammer-less mechanisms found on most bolt rifles. Furthermore, pump actions often have little or no mechanical leverage in order to aid in chambering and primary extraction, as opposed to a traditional turn-bolt action.

See also 
 List of weapons
 List of firearms
 List of rifles
 List of machine guns
 List of bolt-action rifles
 List of submachine guns
 List of assault rifles
 List of battle rifles
 List of semi-automatic rifles
 List of carbines
 List of straight-pull rifles
 List of multiple-barrel firearms
 List of pistols
 List of revolvers
 List of sniper rifles
 List of shotguns

References

Pump-action rifles